A System Requirements Specification (SyRS) (abbreviated SysRS to be distinct from a software requirements specification (SRS)) is a structured collection of information that embodies the requirements of a system.

A business analyst (BA), sometimes titled system analyst, is responsible for analyzing the business needs of their clients and stakeholders to help identify business problems and propose solutions. Within the systems development life cycle domain, the BA typically performs a liaison function between the business side of an enterprise and the information technology department or external service providers.

See also
Business analysis
Business process reengineering
Business requirements
Concept of operations
Data modeling
Information technology
Process modeling
Requirement
Requirements analysis
Software requirements specification
Systems analysis
Use case

References

External links
 IEEE Guide for Developing System Requirements Specifications (IEEE Std 1233, 1999 Edition)
 IEEE Guide for Developing System Requirements Specifications (IEEE Std 1233, 1998 Edition)
 DAU description System/Subsystem Specification, Data Item Description (SSS-DID)
 System Requirements Specification for STEWARDS example SRS at USDA

Software engineering
Systems analysis
Systems engineering

ru:Техническое задание